Ariel is a brand of laundry detergent developed by P&G European Technology Centre in Belgium. The enzymes for the detergent are provided by Novozymes.

History
It was launched in multiple markets between 1967 and 1969. The brand is owned by US multinational Procter & Gamble and is popular in Mexico and India.

References

External links
Official UK Website
Official German Website

Products introduced in 1967
Cleaning product brands
Laundry detergents
Procter & Gamble brands
Consumer goods
British brands